Whittleia retiella is a moth of the Psychidae family. It is found in Great Britain, the Netherlands, France, Germany, Denmark and Sweden.

The wingspan is 13–17 mm. Adult males are on wing from April to May. Females are wingless.

The larvae feed on Puccinellia maritima, Artemisia and Atriplex species. The case is sparsely covered with grass. The length of the case is 8–12 mm. The larvae itself is yellowish with brown shields on the thorax. The head is black.

Subspecies
Whittleia retiella retiella
Whittleia retiella cimbriella Rebel, 1938

References

Moths described in 1847
Psychidae
Moths of Europe